Balwant Singh (1820–1853) was the ruler of the princely state of Bharatpur in India from 1825 till his death, and successor to Maharaja Baldeo Singh. He was in turn succeeded by  Maharaja Jashwant Singh.

References 

1820 births
Rulers of Bharatpur state
1853 deaths
Jat rulers
Jat